Maryul also called mar-yul of mngah-ris, was the western most Tibetan kingdom based in modern-day Ladakh and some parts of Tibet. The kingdom had its capital at Shey.

It stretched from the Zoji La at the border of Kashmir to Demchok in the southeast, and included Rudok and other areas presently in Tibet. The kingdom came under the control of the Namgyal dynasty in 1460, eventually acquiring the name "Ladakh", and lasted until 1842. In that year, the Dogra general Zorawar Singh, having conquered it, made it part of the would-be princely state of Jammu and Kashmir.

Etymology 
Mar-yul has been interpreted in Tibetan sources as lowland (of Ngari),. Scholars suspect that it was a proper name that was in use earlier, even before Ladakh was Tibetanised. For instance, the Chinese Buddhist pilgrim Xuanzang referred to it as Mo-lo-so, which would lead to a reconstructed name such as *Malasa, *Marāsa, or *Mrāsa. The Annals of Tun‐Huang state that the Tibetan government carried out a census of Zan-zun and Mar(d) in 719 CE. The Persian text Hudud al-Alam refers to a "wealthy country of Tibet", with a tribe named Mayul. These facts suggest that Mar-yul ("land of Mar") might have been a proper name of the country.

The name was in use at least until the 16th century. Mirza Haidar Dughlat referred to it as Maryul and named a region called "Ladaks" that was apparently distinct from Maryul. It was also used by the Portuguese Jesuit missionary Francisco de Azevedo when he visited Ladakh in 1631, but his usage of the name has been described as Luciano Petech as referring to neither the Kingdom of Ladakh nor Rudok.

The newer name La-dwags  (historically transliterated as La-dvags) means "land of high passes". Ladak is its pronunciation in several Tibetan districts, and Ladakh is a transliteration of the Persian spelling.

Background 

By late ninth century, one of his grandsons Depal Khortsen was controlling most of Central Tibet. Upon his assassination, one of his sons Kyide Nyimagon, made it to West Tibet — the causes are disputed.

Nyimagon entered into a marital alliance with a high-nobility of Purang and established his kingdom, stretching from the Mayum La in the east to the Zoji La in the west. Upon his death , his vast kingdom was divided among his three sons: the eldest son, Lhachen Palgyigon, receiving Maryul, the second son, Trashigon, receiving Guge and Purang, and the third son, Detsukgon, receiving Zanskar (mountainous area between Ladakh and Kashmir).

Thus, the Kingdom of Maryul was founded by Lhachen Palgyigon (dPal-gyi-mgon) when he was still a prince.

Description 

The kingdom of Maryul is described in the Ladakh Chronicles (Francke's translation) to consist of:
 Mar-yul of mNah-ris (Leh district), the inhabitants using the black bows; Ru-thogs (Rudok) of the east and the gold mine of hGog (possibly Thok Jalung); nearer this way lDe-mchog-dkar-po (Demchok Karpo);
 at the frontier:
 Ra-ba-dmar-po (possibly near Rabma, which lies halfway between Spanggur and Rudok);
 Wam-le (Hanle), to the top of the pass of the Yi-mig rock (Imis Pass);
 to the west to the foot of the Kashmir pass (Zoji La), from the cavernous stone upward hither,
 to the north to the gold mine of hGog;
 all the places belonging to rGya (Gya, on the way from Leh to Rupshu).
The description makes clear that Purig (the Suru River basin near present-day Kargil) was included in Maryul, but Zanskar to the west was not. The latter went to the third son Detsukgon along with Lahul and Spiti. The Rupshu highland was regarded as the frontier between Maryul and Zanskar. Baltistan to the north was also not included in Maryul.

The southern border of Maryul towards Guge is much harder to discern.  A. H. Francke believed that the second heir Tashigon received "a long and narrow strip of country along the northern slope of the Himalayas, of which Purang and Guge are the best-known provinces". Maryul encompassed all the areas to the north of this narrow strip. This view is not favoured by other scholars. Luciano Petech opined that Palgyigon received the territories that he himself conquered, whereas the paternal territory was divided among the other two sons. He also favoured Zahidurddin Ahmad's revised translation of the text from Ladakh Chronicles, which states that all the places mentioned in the description lie on the frontier of Maryul, including Demchok Karpo and Raba Marpo.

First dynasty (930–1460)

Scholar Luciano Petech says that even though Palgyigon's father theoretically bequeathed Maryul to him, the actual conquest of the territories was carried out by Palgyigon himself, whom Petech identifies as "the founder and organiser of the Ladakhi kingdom".

It appears that the second son Trashigon, who inherited Guge, died without issue. His kingdom was acquired by Detsukgon of Zanskar. The latter's son, Yeshe-Ö became a prominent ruler that reestablished Buddhism in West Tibet and Tibet in general. Maryul, belonging to the senior branch, is believed to have extended some form of suzerainty over the other branches.

By 1100 AD, the kingdom of Guge was sufficiently weakened that the king Lhachen Utpala of Maryul brought it under his control. From this time onward, Guge was generally subsidiary to Maryul.

During his reign, Blo-gros-mc-og-Idan sent presents to the 1st Dalai Lama, patronized the Gelug scholar gSan-p'u-ba Lha dban-blo-gros, and raided the Kingdom of Guge. The final years of his reign were disastrous, and he was eventually deposed in 1460, ending his dynasty.

Second dynasty (1460–1842) 

In 1460, the Namgyal dynasty was established. According to the Ladakh Chronicles, the warlike Lhachen Bhagan formed an alliance with the people of Leh and dethroned the Maryul king Blo-gros-mc-og-ldan and his brothers drun-pa A-li and Slab-bstan-dar-rgyas.

Sengge Namgyal (r. 1616–1642), the "Lion" King, made efforts to restore Ladakh to its old glory by an ambitious and energetic building program including the Leh Palace and the rebuilding of several gompas, the most famous of which are Hemis and Hanle.

Treaty of Tingmosgang 

Guge was annexed by Ladakh in the second quarter of the 17th century. This invited retaliation from Lhasa, whose forces drove out the Ladakhis and laid siege to Ladakh itself. Ladakh was forced to seek help from the Mughal Empire in Kashmir, leading to the Tibet–Ladakh–Mughal War. At the end of the conflict, in 1684, the Treaty of Tingmosgang was agreed, affirming that:

Despite the apparent invocation of the "boundaries fixed in the beginning", the extensive dominions granted in the original inheritance were not retained by Maryul. The treaty itself makes clear that Rudok was no more a part of Maryul and various restrictions were placed on trade with Rudok. Scholar Gerhard Emmer states that Ladakh was reduced to approximately its current extent. It was henceforth treated as being outside Ngari Khorsum, as a buffer state against Mughal India. The territories of Guge, Purang and Rudok were annexed to Tibet and the frontier with Tibet was fixed at the Lha-ri stream near Demchok. The reason for this exclusion was apparently Ladakh's syncretism and its willingness to ally with Mughal India. Ladakh was instructed in the treaty:

Dogra–Tibetan War

The Namgyal dynasty ended in 1842 after an invasion of Ladakh from the Dogra dynasty of Jammu and Kashmir.

A historical claim was again made in the 19th century, after the Dogra general Zorawar Singh conquered Ladakh. Singh claimed all of western Tibet up to the Mayum Pass as Ladakhi territory and occupied it. Once again, Lhasa dispatched troops that defeated Zorawar Singh and laid siege to Leh. After the Dogras received reinforcements, a stalemate was obtained and the Treaty of Chushul reconfirmed the "old, established frontiers".

See also 
History of Ladakh

Notes

References

Bibliography
 
 
 
 
 
 
 
 
 
 
 
 
 

History of Ladakh
History of Gilgit-Baltistan
History of Tibet
Former countries in Chinese history
930 establishments
1842 disestablishments in Asia